TANS Perú, an acronym for Transportes Aéreos Nacionales de Selva, was a Peruvian airline based in Lima. The airline was headquartered at the Miraflores District in the capital city of the country. Completely state-owned, the carrier operated scheduled domestic passenger and cargo services from its main base at Jorge Chávez International Airport.

History
TANS (also known as Grupo Aéreo de Transporte 42 was established in 1963 as an arm of the Peruvian Air Force, based at the remote city of Iquitos, inaccessible by road, and tasked with providing scheduled airline flights, together with fulfilling search and rescue and medevac needs. In 1988, its fleet consisted of a mixture of Pilatus PC-6 Porters and de Havilland Canada DHC-6 Twin Otters, mainly operating as floatplanes. Although its missions were mainly civilian, it remained part of the Air Force until 1999, being granted civil certification in November 1999.

At , the fleet included three Boeing 737-200s, seven de Havilland DHC-6 Twin Otter Series 300, one Fokker F-28 Mk1000 and five HAMC Y-12-IIs; at this time, services to Arequipa, Chiclayo, Cuzco, Iquitos, Juanjuí, Juliaca, Lima, Piura, Pucallpa, Rioja, Trujillo and Yurimaguas were operated. In  the airline's license was suspended by the Peruvian Government.

Destinations

TANS Perú served the following destinations throughout its history:

Accidents and incidents
Aviation Safety Network records six accidents/incidents for the airline, of which five led to fatalities; the number of casualties involved in these deadly accidents totals 105. All the events the airline experienced throughout its history carried with the hull-loss of the aircraft involved. Following is the list of these events.

See also

List of airlines of Peru
Transport in Peru

References

 
Defunct airlines of Peru
Airlines established in 1963
Airlines disestablished in 2006
Government-owned airlines